Patrick Holland may refer to:

 Patrick Holland (author) (born 1977), Australian novelist 
 Patrick Holland (criminal) (died 2009), Irish career criminal 
 Patrick Holland (ice hockey) (born 1992), Canadian ice hockey player
Pat Holland (born 1950), English former footballer who played for West Ham United
 Pat Holland (snowboarder) (born ), won a Bronze Medal at the 2009–10 FIS Snowboard World Cup, younger brother of Nate Holland
Patrick L. Holland (born 1971), American chemist

See also 
 Patrick Rolland, French ice hockey player